Elections were held on November 10, 1980 in the Regional Municipality of Ottawa-Carleton. This page lists the election results for local mayors, reeves and councils of the RMOC in 1980.

Cumberland
Reeve race

Council  Four to be elected

Gloucester
Reeve race

Betty Stewart was re-elected After a judicial recount conducted December 9-10. Election night results showed her opponent, Fred Barrett ahead as did a recount conducted on November 16.

 

Council  Six to be elected; top two to sit on regional council

Goulbourn
Mayoral race

Council

Kanata
Mayoral race

Council

Nepean
Mayoral race
(216 of 218 polls)

Council 

Nepean voters also voted to legalize wine stores in the city.

Osgoode
Reeve race

Council  4 to be elected

Ottawa

Mayor race

Rideau
Reeve race

Council

Rockcliffe Park
Reeve race

Council  4 to be elected

Vanier
Mayoral race

Council

West Carleton
Mayoral race

Council

References

Municipal elections in Ottawa
1980 elections in Canada